Route 93 is a major east–west highway on the island of Oahu which begins as Interstate H-1 (H-1) terminates in Kapolei and ends at Kaena Point on the extreme northwest end of Oahu, just past Makaha. It is part of the Farrington Highway.

Route description
As H-1 ends near Kapolei and Ko Olina, it continues as a four lane, and then two lane highway up into the Waianae and Makaha area, the "Leeward Coast", of west Oahu.

History
A rough road around the point, following a disused railroad, had already existed but was not suitable for most vehicle traffic.

Major intersections

References

External links

Route Log on Hawaii Route 93

0093
Transportation in Honolulu County, Hawaii